Dick Vaughn's Moribund Music Of The '70s is a collection of recordings edited from a wealth of material broadcast on KPFA's Over the Edge radio show, hosted by Don Joyce weekly and featuring members of Negativland, as well as material recorded at a Live Negativland show just after the "U2 Scandal."  The recordings are broken up into two discs, and within that contain bits and pieces of many different Over The Edge Shows.

Everything centers around one recurring character that has made many appearances on Over The Edge, that of radio personality Dick Vaughn, played by Richard Lyons. Track 1 of Disc 1 is taken from a recording that was played to live audiences during the tour that took place just after the U2 Scandal.  Tracks 2 - 9 are taken from "The California Superstation" broadcast, a parody of corporate radio which had some listeners convinced KPFA had actually undergone a format change. This was also hosted by Lyons as Dick Vaughn, and performed with Negativland's typical tongue-placed-in-cheek.  Tracks 10 & 11 are snippets taken from other Dick Vaughn pranks, in both cases involving other people's radio shows.  Tracks 12 & 13 of Disc 1, and Tracks 1 - 6 of Disc Two are taken from the "Moribund Music Of The '70s" show, in which Dick Vaughn begins the first-ever "'70s Nostalgia" broadcast, complete with authentic 1970s radio gimmicks, commercials, and the usual Negativland sense of humor.  Tracks 7 - 10 of Disc two are all taken from different shows, and feature commentary on the "Moribund" show, another classic Dick Vaughn prank, and a 15 Minute excerpt from the "Dick Is Dead" show.  Finally, Tracks 11 & 12 are taken from a live Negativland performance, and includes the complete tape that opens the CD.  

Originally released in 1990 by SST Records on cassette only, it was re-released in 2001 by Negativland's own label, Seeland Records, as a CD. The CD version contains material not included on the original release, and also omits and rearranges some material from the original.

Track listing

DISC ONE
"Introduction" (1:37)
"Ron Baile's School of Broadcast, The Mating Line, More On Music, etc." (8:14)
"James Gabbert's Delight, Pat Boone's Cow, Evening Magazine, etc." (7:44)
"Roy Storey's Sports Line #1" (2:46)
"More More On Music, Suicide Man, Idle Threats, etc." (7:51)
"Celebrity Wives Quiz, More Idle Threats, People Are Talking, etc." (9:29)
"Roy Storey's Sports Line #2" (3:18)
"Earwitness News and Back to More Music, etc." (9:00)
"TV Trivia, Dick or Dukes of Hazzard, More More on Music, Suicide Man Again, etc." (5:34)
"Ringo is Dead" (6:55)
"An Apology to Roy (Roy Storey's Sports Line #3)" (3:14)
"Introduction, Witness for the Documentation, Disclaimers and Floaters, etc." (8:03)
"More Music, How to Use Your Cubulax, Ford For President, etc." (5:14)

DISC TWO
"Off-Air Comments #1, Household Vocable, Wrong Cues Begin, Is He Stoned?, etc." (4:27)
"News Headlines, More Wrong Cues, Top 10 Countdown, etc." (6:15)
"Off-Air Survey: You MUST Be Hearing These Recordings!" (6:58)
"Countdown Continues, Still More Wrong Cues, Moribund Music of the 80's, etc." (5:17)
"Off-Air Comments #2, Suicide Man: It Doesn't Seem to Be Flowing Very Well, Ruining the Concept, Six Months of My Life, etc." (7:41)
"More Off-Air Surveys: Rainbow Gets Jammed, Suicide Man's Universal Theory" (6:38)
"Oslo Norway and Psychic Freeze" (4:38)
"Crosley Bendix and the Damage Done" (6:30)
"Dick Vaughn, Popular TV-mentalist" (1:22)
"Dick Is Dead" (15:20)
"A Tape for All Deaths" (5:00)
"The Hell-Bound Plane" (7:13)

Personnel
Don Joyce
David Wills
Mark Hosler
Richard Lyons
Chris Grigg
Ian Allen
Earl Yazel
Jim Bryan
Doug Wulff. 
Rob Wortman
Arne Ryason
Brook Hinton (Kings House)
Dr. Oslo Norway
Crosley Bendix
Peter Conheim
George Prepared
Enrico Gomez
Steve Vernon

Negativland albums
1995 compilation albums
SST Records compilation albums
Seeland Records compilation albums